The Red Streak was a tabloid format newspaper published in Chicago from October 2002 to December 2005. It was published by the Chicago Sun-Times, as a competitor to RedEye, which was published by the Chicago Tribune.

Defunct newspapers published in Chicago
Publications established in 2002
Publications disestablished in 2005
2002 establishments in Illinois
2005 disestablishments in Illinois